Gordon Anderson (9 January 1922 – 10 December 2013) was a New Zealand cricketer. He played in six first-class matches for Canterbury between 1949 and 1951.

See also
 List of Canterbury representative cricketers

References

External links
 

1922 births
2013 deaths
New Zealand cricketers
Canterbury cricketers
Cricketers from Christchurch